Aurélia Clementine Oona Moorine Hannah Madeleine Thierrée (born 24 September 1971 in Montpellier, France) is a French actress and dancer.

Biography
Thierrée is the daughter of Victoria Chaplin and Jean-Baptiste Thierrée and the sister of James Thierrée. She is the granddaughter of Charlie Chaplin and Oona O'Neill. Her first cousins are fellow actresses Carmen, Kiera, and Oona Chaplin. Kiera is also a model.

Filmography
Hydrolution (1988)
 (1993)
La Belle Verte (1996)
The People vs. Larry Flynt (1996)
Sentimental Education (1998)
Far from China (2001)
 (2003)Goya's Ghosts (2006)The Favor (2006)24 Bars (2007)The Farewell (2011)Valley of Love (2015)Wetware (2018)Twice Upon a Time (2019)

References
Fabienne Darge, "Un Oratorio taillé dans l'étoffe des rêves", Le Monde, February 27, 2007
Misha Berson, "Performer Aurélia Thierrée is a flexible pixie with a heavyweight pedigree", The Seattle Times, May 9, 2008
Benedict Nightingale, "Chaplin's granddaughter: the family business", The Times, December 12, 2011
Alexandre Demidoff, "Aurélia Thierrée, reine de la fugue", Le Temps'', December 6, 2012

External links

French film actresses
French people of American descent
French people of English descent
French people of Irish descent
French television actresses
Actors from Montpellier
Thierée
1971 births
Living people